Deborah Richter, also known as Debi Richter, is an American actress. She appeared in the films Cyborg (1989), Square Dance (1987), Winners Take All (1987) and Hot Moves (1985). She also appeared on TV in Hill Street Blues (alongside her husband Charles Haid) and All is Forgiven.

Filmography

Film

Television

References

External links

American film actresses
American television actresses
Living people
Year of birth missing (living people)